The Bullard Memorial Farm  is a historic farm located at 7 Bullard Lane in Holliston, Massachusetts.   It was first settled by Benjamin Bullard in approximately 1652. The land was purchased from local Native Americans.  Bullards farmed the land until 1916, when John Anson Bullard bequeathed it to the Bullard Memorial Farm Association (“BMFA”), which had been created in 1909. The main house was built in 1777 and enlarged in 1794; the property has a number of outbuildings, including a barn, a vinegar building, a cider building, a blacksmith shop, a library, a locker building, a small shed/horse barn, and a cottage. The farm includes  under a forestry and agricultural designation and another  are undeveloped pasture."  The farm was listed on the National Register of Historic Places in 1995.

See also
National Register of Historic Places listings in Middlesex County, Massachusetts

References

External links
 

Farms on the National Register of Historic Places in Massachusetts
Houses completed in 1777
Buildings and structures in Holliston, Massachusetts
National Register of Historic Places in Middlesex County, Massachusetts